Bruce Sutherland (26 February 1926 – 8 September 2010, in Santa Monica CA) was an American pianist, music educator and composer.

Life and career
Bruce Sutherland studied with Ethel Leginska and Amparo Iturbi. His debut as a pianist was a radio broadcast with the KFI Symphony conducted by James Sample and playing Nights In The Gardens Of Spain by de Falla.

Sutherland became notable as a composer with the prize-winning Allegro Fanfara, which premiered at the International Gottschalk Competition in New Orleans. José Iturbi conducted the Bridgeport Symphony Orchestra with David Bar-Illan performing as piano soloist.

In his latter years, Sutherland became noted as a teacher. Notable students include Max Levinson, John Novacek, and Rufus Choi.

Works
Selected works include:
Allegro Fanfara
Work for two pianos
Prelude
Sonatina for piano

References

External links
iCadenza interview with Bruce Sutherland from YouTube.

1926 births
2010 deaths
American music educators
American male classical composers
American classical composers
Place of birth missing
20th-century American pianists
20th-century American composers
American male pianists
20th-century American male musicians